Bouzid is a name, primarily used in North Africa. It can be both a given name and a surname. Notable people with the name include:

 Bouzid Mahyouz (born 1952), Algerian footballer
 Adam Bouzid (born 1987), French-Algerian footballer
 Ismaël Bouzid (born 1983), Algerian footballer
 Lakdar Bouzid (born 1936), Tunisian modern pentathlete
 Leyla Bouzid (born 1984), Tunisian screenwriter and film director
 Nouri Bouzid (born 1945), Tunisian film director and screenwriter

See also
 Sidi Bouzid, Tunisian city
 Sidi Bouzid, Algeria, town and commune in Laghouat Province